Cathia Jenainati is a feminist author. She was a Full Professor in English and Comparative Studies at the University of Warwick before joining the Lebanese American University (LAU) as Dean of the School of Arts and Sciences. During her time at Warwick, she founded the School for Cross-faculty Studies, which comprises three divisions: the Liberal Arts division, the Global Sustainable Development division, and the Institute of Global Sustainable Development.

Early life and education
Jenainati earned her Bachelor of Science and Master's degree from the American University of Beirut (AUB) before enrolling at the University of Warwick for her PhD. She also earned a Bachelor of Arts degree from Lebanese American University in English Literature.

Career
Upon receiving her PhD, Jenainati joined the faculty of English and Comparative Literary Studies at the University of Warwick. During her tenure at the university, she founded the School for Cross-faculty Studies, including the Global Sustainable Development and Liberal Arts divisions, and founded the Institute for Global Sustainable Development. Prior to leaving the institution, she was appointed a Founding Fellow of the Warwick International Higher Education Academy from 2015 until 2018 and was nominated for their Inspirational Leadership Award. Jenainati also sits on various boards including chairing the UK’s Interdisciplinary Group and the International Advisory Board for the Dean and Management of AUB which meets once a year in Amsterdam.

In 2019, Jenainati left the University of Warwick to become Dean of the School of Arts and Sciences at LAU. In the same year, she also published Introducing Feminism: A Graphic Guide with illustrations from Judy Groves.

References

Living people
English feminists
English feminist writers
American University of Beirut alumni
Academic staff of the American University of Beirut
Lebanese American University alumni
Alumni of the University of Warwick
Academics of the University of Warwick
Year of birth missing (living people)